Charles Eustace Hadden Poynder (15 July 1910 – 29 August 1994) was an English cricketer. Poynder was a right-handed batsman. He was born in Barnstaple, Devon.

Poynder made his Minor Counties Championship debut for Devon in 1928 against Dorset. From 1928 to 1946, he represented the county in 46 Championship matches, the last of which came against Dorset. In 1937, Poynder made his only first-class appearance when he represented a combined Minor Counties team against the touring New Zealanders at the Rose Brothers Ground, Gainsborough. In the Minor Counties first-innings he scored 3 runs before being dismissed by Bill Carson. in their second innings he was again dismissed for 3 runs by the same bowler.

He died in Peterborough, Cambridgeshire on 29 August 1994.

References

External links
Charles Poynder at ESPNcricinfo
Charles Poynder at CricketArchive

1910 births
1994 deaths
Sportspeople from Barnstaple
English cricketers
Devon cricketers
Minor Counties cricketers